Deal Breaker is a 1995 thriller novel by Harlan Coben and is the first in his Myron Bolitar series.

Plot
Investigator and sports agent Myron Bolitar is poised on the edge of the big-time. So is Christian Steele, a rookie quarterback and Myron's prized client. But when Christian gets a phone call from a former girlfriend, a woman whom everyone, including the police, believes is dead, the deal starts to go sour. Suddenly Myron is plunged into a baffling mystery of sex and blackmail. Trying to unravel the truth about a family's tragedy, a woman's secret and a man's lies, Myron is up against the dark side of his business—where image and talent make you rich, but the truth can get you killed.

Character list
Myron Bolitar : Ex-basketball player, currently works as sports agent. Owner of MB SportReps
Windsor "Win" Horne Lockwood, III : Myron's best friend and wealthy owner of Lock-Horne Investments & Securities.
Esperanza Diaz : one of Myron's best friends currently working for Myron.
Jessica : Myron's former girlfriend and current love interest, sister to the missing girl.
Christian Steele : Football star, drafted by the Titans.
Jake Courter : Sheriff Jake, who helps Myron solve the case.
Herman Ache and Frank Ache : Notoriously known criminals.
Otto Burke : Owner of an NFL team (Titans)
Larry Hanson : former football legend turned executive. Currently working for Otto
Adam Culver : Jessica's and Kathy's dad who been murdered three nights before the start of the series
Roy O' Connor : Sports agent
Paul Duncan : Adam Culver's best friend who works as a cop.
Carol Culver : Jessica and Kathy's Mother and Adam Culver's widow.
Master Kwan : Win and Myron's Tae Kwan Do Master.
Aaron : Frank and Herman Ache's employee

Film adaptation
A film adaptation is in development after the rights to the Myron Bolitar novels was bought by Columbia Pictures.

Awards
The novel won the 1996 Anthony Award and received an Edgar award nomination in the "Best Paperback original" category.

References

1995 American novels
Novels by Harlan Coben
American thriller novels
Anthony Award-winning works

he:מיירון בוליטר#ספרי הסדרה